Renee Humphrey is an American actress who has appeared in both film and television.

Career
Humphrey was born in San Mateo, California and grew up in the Marinwood area of Marin County. She worked extensively as an actress in film and television from 1991 through 2000. Her performance as Hillary in the indie film Fun landed her a special jury prize for acting at the 1994 Sundance Film Festival. She is known to Kevin Smith fans as Trisha "Trish the Dish" Jones in Mallrats (1995) and Jay and Silent Bob Strike Back (2001). In 2005, Titan Motion Picture Group was established and she and her Titan MPG producing partners made the film Family. (U.S. broadcast rights were purchased by Lifetime Movie Network.)

Filmography

Film

Television

References

External links

An Interview with Renee Humphrey

Actresses from California
Living people
20th-century American actresses
21st-century American actresses
American film actresses
American television actresses
1975 births